Christopher Coppola (born November 26, 1968) is an American actor, voice artist, and comedian.

Career
Chris is best known for his roles in such movies as Friday the 13th, Far Cry, Postal, Loveless in Los Angeles, The Polar Express, Beowulf, and Diary of a Wimpy Kid: The Long Haul. He also voiced Dancer in Santa Buddies, and appeared in the episode "Tailgate" on the sitcom How I Met Your Mother.

Filmography

Film

Television

References

External links

American male voice actors
American male comedians
21st-century American comedians
Living people
American male film actors
American male television actors
Place of birth missing (living people)
1968 births